Lyubomir Lyubenov (born 25 August 1980, in Sofia) is a Bulgarian footballer who currently plays as a midfielder for Levski Chepintsi.

Career

Club
Lyubenov signed with Chernomorets in June 2007 for a free transfer from Naftex Burgas. After being released by Chernomorets, in February 2009 he signed a contract with Polish side Arka Gdynia. The midfielder/winger played for PFC Nesebar, Marek Dupnitsa, Levski Sofia, Rodopa Smolyan, Litex Lovech and Naftex Burgas.

Successes
 Vice-champion with Levski Sofia in 2004.

References

External links
 
 
 Profile at LevskiSofia.info

1980 births
Living people
Bulgarian footballers
First Professional Football League (Bulgaria) players
PFC CSKA Sofia players
PFC Marek Dupnitsa players
PFC Levski Sofia players
PFC Rodopa Smolyan players
PFC Litex Lovech players
Neftochimic Burgas players
PFC Chernomorets Burgas players
Arka Gdynia players
Olimpia Elbląg players
FC Etar 1924 Veliko Tarnovo players
FK Pelister players
FC Septemvri Simitli players
Expatriate footballers in North Macedonia
Bulgarian expatriate footballers
Expatriate footballers in Poland
Bulgarian expatriate sportspeople in Poland
Footballers from Sofia
Association football midfielders